The Panasonic Lumix DMC-FZ28 is a superzoom bridge digital camera, replacing the similar Panasonic Lumix DMC-FZ18. It was announced in 2008 and released for sale in the United Kingdom in August of that year. Like the FZ18 it has a Leica lens with an 18x optical zoom ratio. It has a slightly larger sensor than the FZ18, a 10.1-megapixel image resolution, and the newer Venus IV image processing engine.

Description

The camera's macro mode allows the capturing of images at a distance of one centimetre. The camera also has intelligent scene detection, 15x face recognition, intelligence ISO, intelligent exposure. Three different aspect ratios are available: 4:3, 3:2 and 16:9. Still image quality settings include different qualities of JPEG output and RAW format (in .RW2 format); both JPEG and RAW recordings can be produced simultaneously. Various high-speed burst modes are available, going up to thirteen frames per second at two megapixels in 16:9 aspect ratio.

Video output is 1280x720 p at 30 frame/s HD 1080i in QuickTime format.

There are three data outputs: AV, component out, and USB2.0. Internal memory is 50 MB, supplemented by removable SD or SDHC cards of multi-gigabyte capacity.

External links 
http://www.dpreview.com/news/0807/08072104panasonicfz28.asp

Bridge digital cameras
Superzoom cameras
FZ28
Products introduced in 2008